The Ibanez E-Gen was an electric guitar introduced by Ibanez in 2008 as Herman Li’s signature model. It is derived from the Ibanez S prestige models.

Features 
The E-Gen is a solid body electric guitar made of mahogany with a flame maple top. The neck is a five piece maple/walnut configuration. It features jumbo frets, a rosewood fingerboard and an abalone oval inlay. It features the Edge Zero bridge as well. The pickups are custom designed by DiMarzio. It features a bolt on wizard one neck, and is an arch top guitar. The hardware has a gold finish and the body has a transparent violet flat finish. In addition, frets 21-24 are scalloped and the routings on the upper horn of the guitar form a grip handle, alluding to the "monkey"-shaped grip handle of the Ibanez Jem series. On May 9, Li announced on his Facebook page that he received an Ibanez E-Gen 7 String. The details of the guitar are unknown except that it is a seven string and that whether or not it will be a mass or limited production guitar for his signature guitar series. In January 2011, Li announced the E-Gen 7 string guitar would be in Blue/White or Red/Orange. In April 2011, Li posted a picture of an Ibanez E-Gen 7 String in Chameleon Violet on his Facebook page.

The EGEN series was discontinued after 2019.

References 

E-Gen